Johann Bauer may refer to:
Johann Bauer (soldier) (1916–1974), German World War II Knight's Cross recipient
Johann Hermann Bauer (1861–1891), Austrian chess master
Johann Christian Bauer (1802–1867), German type designer and punchcutter